Paolo Scaroni (born 28 November 1946) is an Italian businessman and banker, currently the chair of A.C. Milan. Between 2002 and 2014 he has been chief executive officer of Italian energy companies Enel and Eni.

Education
In 1969, Scaroni graduated from Bocconi University of Milan in the field of economics. In 1973 he obtained an MBA from Columbia Business School.

Career
In 1969, Scaroni joined Chevron Corporation for three years. After obtaining MBA, Scaroni was an associate at McKinsey & Company. In 1973, he joined Saint-Gobain, where he held different positions, culminating with his appointment as president of flat glass division. In 1985, he was appointed CEO of Techint. In 1996, he moved to the United Kingdom to become chief executive officer of Pilkington.

Enel and Eni

From May 2002 to May 2005 he served as CEO of Enel, Italy's leading electricity company. At Enel, Scaroni made a real breakthrough by abandoning the traditional multi-utility corporate model, supported by his predecessor Franco Tatò, in favour of placing greater focus on the core energy business. Under his mandate, Enel created a separate wind energy unit and, for the first time, Enel was included in the Dow Jones Sustainability Index. In 2005 he was appointed CEO of ENI, the Italian multinational energy company, considered one of the seven world supermajors. In his 9 years at ENI, Scaroni reduced the weight of oil in favour of natural gas, seen as an intermediate transition combustible in the path toward even more sustainable sources. In 2012, Eni was included in the Carbon Performance Leadership Index, which scores companies based on their commitment to transparency and environmental leadership. During Paolo Scaroni's tenure ENI net worth increased from €39 billions to €61 billions. He left his role in 2014.

A.C. Milan
On 21 July 2018 he became chair of A.C. Milan after the club was taken over by Elliott Management Corporation. He was one of the 8 directors of the club after the takeover by Li Yonghong. In June 2020, Li accused Scaroni of having a conflict of interest in the club's management. Among other issues, Li cited Scaroni's position as deputy chairman of Rothschild Italia (which advised on the acquisition of the club) as well as his prior business relationship with Elliott. Paolo Scaroni has won the Scudetto Serie A 2021–2022 as President of A.C. Milan on 22 May 2022, and was confirmed in his position as Chairman in September 2022 also following the acquisition of Milan AC by US Fund RedBird.

Other current and past roles 
In addition to his executive management position, Scaroni, has or has had numerous non-executive roles, amongst which:

 Deputy Chairman of Rothchild & Co.
 Vice Chairman of the London Stock Exchange
 Chairman of Giuliani Group srl
 Chairman of Sicura SpA
 Chairman of Alliance Unichem
 President of L.R. Vicenza
 board member of Veolia Environment
 board member of BAE Systems
 board member of ABN AMRO
 board member of Alstom
 board member of Assicurazioni Generali 
 Member of Board of Overseers of Columbia Business School
 Member of Board of Overseers of Fondazione Teatro La Scala 
 Member of International Advisory Council of Bocconi University

Political and economic views
Paolo Scaroni has never taken political positions supporting one particular party or coalition, and is considered as having excellent relationship and supporters across the political spectrum.

When questioned on energy transition and sustainability he has often stressed that renewables energy sources alone won't be sufficient to achieve the ambitious CO2 reduction goals that Europe has set. According to Scaroni such goals can only be met if, in addition to the use of renewables, a strong emphasis is put on energy efficiency measures and a pervasive reengineering of industrial processes. He also is an advocate of the use of nuclear energy as a way to reduce CO2.

Honours
In 2004, Scaroni was decorated as Cavaliere del Lavoro. In November 2007 Scaroni was decorated as a member of the Légion d'honneur.

Tangentopoli 
In his career Paolo Scaroni has been involved in a few judicial proceedings. As part of the massive "Tangentopoli" scandal that brought down Italy's post-war political parties, in 1996, Scaroni was sentenced to one year and four months in prison (below the limit of execution of the sentence), and the offence was finally declared extinct by Milan tribunal in 2001.

Subsequently in his roles as CEO of ENEL and ENI, he was involved in three judicial investigations (ENEL Porto Tolle, ENI/Saipem Algeria, ENI/Shell Nigeria) but, on those, he was definitively acquainted in 2017, 2020, and 2022 respectively.

References

External links
 Biography of Paolo Scaroni (Eni Foundation's website)
 Blog about Paolo Scaroni
 Biography of Paolo Scaroni (Generali website)
 Paolo Scaroni on Forbes
 Biography of Paolo Scaroni (Eni Enrico Mattei Foundation's website)
 Biography of Paolo Scaroni (Eni 30percento's website)
 Biography of Paolo Scaroni (eventi Eni's website)
 Biography of Paolo Scaroni (Eni Scuola's website)
 Biography of Paolo Scaroni (Eni award's website)
 Human rights watch

Living people
1946 births
Bocconi University alumni
Eni
Recipients of the Legion of Honour
Columbia Business School alumni
Italian chief executives
McKinsey & Company people
A.C. Milan directors
A.C. Milan chairmen and investors